is a regional political party in Tokyo, Japan.

The party was founded by Tokyo Governor Yuriko Koike in 2017. Koike later stepped down as the party's leader and is no longer officially affiliated with the party, however her policies and image continue to form the backbone of the party's platform and she continues to endorse and campaign for its candidates.

The party won the most seats in the Tokyo Metropolitan Assembly in 2017 in what was widely described as a wave election, the party later lost control of the Assembly in the 2021 election, becoming the second-largest party in the chamber.

History 
The group was founded by Yuriko Koike, governor of Tokyo since 2016.  While still a member of the Liberal Democratic Party (LDP), Koike began laying the groundwork for a new political party in late 2016, when she established the Kibo no Juku ("Academy of Hope") program to train potential political candidates. The program had thousands of applicants.

On 31 May 2017, in advance of the upcoming local elections, she resigned from the LDP, officially becoming the new party's leader and forming an alliance with Komeito in an effort to secure a governing majority in Tokyo's parliament. On 3 July 2017, the alliance took a majority in the prefectural election, pushing out the Liberal Democratic Party with a combined 79 seats of the 127-seat assembly.  All but one of Tomin First's candidates were victorious; senior LDP lawmaker Shigeru Ishiba called the election a "historic defeat" for the LDP.

Koike stepped down as party head shortly after the election and was replaced by Kazusa Noda; Noda himself resigned in September 2017 and was replaced by Chiharu Araki. Two key party members, Shun Otokita and Reiko Ueda, stepped down in October, citing the closed nature of the party's leadership and its restrictions on their activities in the metropolitan assembly.

Koike formed a sister national party, Kibō no Tō, in preparation for the 2017 general election. The party won 50 seats and 17.36% of the vote in the election, becoming the second largest opposition party in the House of Representatives, a result which was nevertheless described as an underperformance for the party given opinion polling and expectations. The party was later effectively disbanded in May 2018 after it merged with the Democratic Party to form the Democratic Party for the People.

In the 2021 Tokyo prefectural election, Tomin First lost a total of 15 seats, losing its status as the largest party in the Assembly to the LDP. Despite the loss of seats, the result was described by analysts as an unexpectedly strong showing from the party, as opinion polls and projections prior to the election had forecast the party losing far more seats.

On October 4, 2021, less than a month before the 2021 Japanese general election, the party announced it had formed a national party called First no Kai. Party leaders justified their decision to create the party by noting that the party, which is currently the second largest party in the Tokyo Metropolitan Assembly, lacks any national representation with the dissolving of Kibō. The party was described by its leader, Chiharu Araki, as being a centrist conservative party. The party plans to field candidates mainly in the Tokyo metropolitan area, but they said that Tokyo mayor Yuriko Koike has not been asked to run for a seat.

Platform 
The party platform for the 2017 Tokyo election advocated open government, proper use of public funds, and stricter penalties for public smoking. However, the party indicated relatively vague policy objectives in advance of the election, and many voted for the party simply in order to prevent the LDP from taking control of the legislature in the wake of its recent scandals.

Presidents

Electoral results

Tokyo gubernatorial election results

Tokyo prefectural election results

References

External links 
 "Tokyo Metropolis residents first group" Official website 
 "Hope Institute" Official website 

Libertarian parties in Japan
Regional parties in Japan
Politics of Tokyo
Political parties established in 2017
Right-wing populist parties
Right-wing populism in Japan